The Social Democratic Party (PSD) was a Spanish social democratic political party, founded in 1976. The leaders of the PSD were Rafael Arias-Salgado and Francisco Fernández Ordóñez.

History
The party was founded through the merge of 6 regional parties: the Social Democratic Group of the Valencian Country, the Social Democratic Party of Asturias, the Andalusian Social Democratic Party, the Basque Social Democratic Party, the Extremaduran Social Democratic Party and the Foral Social Democratic Party of Navarre.

The PSD joined the Union of the Democratic Centre (UCD) in 1977, gaining 14 seats in the 1977 Spanish general election. The party was dissolved in February 1978, fully joining the UCD.

References

1976 establishments in Spain
1978 disestablishments in Spain
Defunct social democratic parties in Spain
Political parties disestablished in 1978
Political parties established in 1976